Amut-piʾel II was a king of Qatna in the 18th century BC. His reign is attested in the archive of Mari between c. 1772-1762 BC, after which, Mari was destroyed by Hammurabi of Babylon and no more information is known about Amut-piʾel. He was the son of king Ishi-Addu, and his own son and crown prince was named Jaḫad-Abum but it is not known if this heir succeeded due to lack of sources. Amut-piʾel II visited Ugarit and met the king of Mari in year 8 of Zimri-Lim's reign.

References

Citations

Sources

18th-century BC rulers
Amorite kings
Qatna
18th-century BC people